Brigadier Alick Drummond Buchanan-Smith, Baron Balerno,  (9 October 1898 – 28 July 1984) was a British soldier and prominent geneticist.

Life
He was born in Glasgow, the son of Alice Lillian (née Buchanan), daughter of Sir George Buchanan, and the Very Rev. George Adam Smith.

The family lived at 22 Sardinia Terrace (now demolished). He was educated at Glasgow Academy and Glenalmond College.

He was commissioned as a 2nd Lieutenant in World War I, 1916–18 with the Gordon Highlanders but was too young for active service.

After the war he studied sciences at the University of Aberdeen where he graduated MA BSc. In 1925 he began lecturing at the Institute of Animal Genetics in Edinburgh where he remained for most of his career. He was awarded a DSc from the University there in 1938, on inbreeding in Jersey cattle. In 1928 he was elected a Fellow of the Royal Society of Edinburgh. His proposers were Robert Blyth Greig, John Bartholomew, D'Arcy Wentworth Thompson and Francis Albert Eley Crew. He served as the Royal Society's vice-president twice: 1966/67 and 1977/80. He was awarded the Society's bicentenary medal in 1983.

He served in the Second World War, 1939–45 with both the 5th and 9th Battalion, Gordon Highlanders on active service in France, and later was Director of the Selection of Personnel, for the War Office. He was appointed an Officer of the Order of the British Empire (OBE) in 1939, promoted to Commander (CBE) in 1945 and he retired in 1956 with the rank of Brigadier. In the 1956 Birthday Honours he was awarded a knighthood, having the honour conferred by HM The Queen on 10 July 1956. He had held many positions in military education. He served from 1953 to 1959 as Chairman of the Central Organisation of Military Education Committees of the Universities and University Colleges, what is now the Council of Military Education Committees of the Universities of the United Kingdom (COMEC).

Originally an agriculturalist, his genetics research earned him the degree of Doctor of Science from the University of Aberdeen, and he lectured in this subject at the University of Edinburgh.

He was created a life peer as Baron Balerno, of Currie in the County of Midlothian on 9 July 1963, having been Deputy Chairman of the Unionist Party in Scotland (1960–1963).

From 1966 to 1970 he was Chairman of Heriot-Watt College. In 1976 he was made an Honorary Member of the British Veterinary Association.

He is buried with his wife, Mary Kathleen Smith of Pittodrie, and eldest son, Rev George Adam Buchanan-Smith (1929–1983) in the north-east corner of Currie Cemetery, next to their second son, Alick Laidlaw Buchanan-Smith.

Family

His siblings included Janet Adam Smith and Kathleen Buchanan Smith who married George Paget Thomson.

In 1926 he married Mary Kathleen Smith. Their children included the politician, Alick Buchanan-Smith and philanthropist, Mary Drummond Corsar (nee Buchanan-Smith).

Publications
Alick Drummond Buchanan Smith; Olive Janet Robinson; D. M. Bryant (1936). The Genetics of the Pig, University of Edinburgh Institute of Animal Genetics. Dordrecht: Springer. , 162 pp.

Arms

References

External links
Generals of World War II

1898 births
1984 deaths
People educated at Glenalmond College
Alumni of the University of Aberdeen
Scottish geneticists
Gordon Highlanders officers
British Army personnel of World War I
Life peers
Academics of the University of Edinburgh
Fellows of the Royal Scottish Geographical Society
Fellows of the Royal Society of Edinburgh
Presidents of the Royal Scottish Geographical Society
Commanders of the Order of the British Empire
Knights Bachelor
Deputy Lieutenants of Midlothian
Scottish justices of the peace
British Army brigadiers of World War II
War Office personnel in World War II
Military personnel from Glasgow
Scientists from Glasgow
Life peers created by Elizabeth II